Alexander J. Phinn (4 June 1944 – 16 November 2018), known professionally as Alec Finn, was a British-born traditional musician who is famous for his unique style of accompaniment on the bouzouki.

He was best known for founding De Dannan in 1974 with Frankie Gavin, Johnny "Ringo" MacDonagh and Charlie Piggott, after a series of music sessions at Tigh Hughes, An Spidéal, Co. Galway.

Music
Finn took up the bouzouki in the 1970s, from a background of playing the guitar in skiffle and blues music. In contrast to most Irish players, he played a round-backed Greek bouzouki, one of the older-style trichordo three course (six string) instruments tuned DAD. The Greek tuning gave him a versatile modal rhythmic background on which to create counterpoint to the melody. He was also an accomplished guitar player, and dabbled in a variety of other string instruments.

From the late 1970s and early 80s, he accompanied several prominent Irish instrumentalists including Frankie Gavin, Mary Bergin and Noel Hill. Many of the recordings he appeared on in this era have been highly acclaimed, and are thought of as influential within the Irish tradition.

He performed with De Dannan up to its dissolution in 2003. After the dissolution of the group, Finn copyrighted the name De Danann (note the slightly different spelling). A dispute arose in July 2009 with his former colleague Frankie Gavin for using the name De Dannan for the Frankie Gavin Quartet, a group which had been in existence parallel to De Dannan since 1991. This resulted in an exchange of legal letters and a public feud (including a confrontational radio interview), and a souring of relations between the two musicians.

Finn reformed a second, parallel version of De Danann with banjoist/keyboardist Brian McGrath, accordionist Derek Hickey, fiddler Mick Conneely, singer Eleanor Shanley, and fellow original De Danann member Johnny "Ringo" McDonagh on bodhrán. They recorded "Wonderwaltz" in 2010.

Frankie Gavin and Alec Finn eventually reconciled in 2016, resuming joint stage appearances and recording two further albums together.

Personal life
Alec Finn was the older brother of the author Gervase Phinn. He changed the spelling of his surname from Phinn to Finn upon moving to Ireland, from his childhood home in Rotherham, West Riding.

After living in various places in Ireland, including Dublin (where he shared a flat with Phil Lynott) and County Galway, he eventually moved to Oranmore Castle with his wife and children. His son, Cian, also became a musician.

Throughout his life he was keenly interested in birds of prey, which resulted in him often taking a hawk into pubs with him in his youth. He was also a talented artist, contributing artwork to many of the albums he was featured on.

He revealed in a 2018 TG4 documentary about his life that he had cancer, and died shortly after the programme was aired in November 2018.

Discography
 Blue Shamrock, solo (1994)
 Innisfree, solo (2003)
 Alec & Cian Finn, with Cian Finn (2018)
 The Corner House Set, with Frankie Gavin, Aidan Coffey and Colm Murphy (2016)
 Polbain to Oranmore, with Kevin Macleod (2003)
 Feadóga Stáin, with Mary Bergin (1979)
 Noel Hill & Tony Linnane, with Noel Hill and Tony Linnane (1979)
 Feadóga Stáin 2, with Mary Bergin (1993)

With Frankie Gavin
 Frankie Gavin & Alec Finn (1977)
 Frankie Goes to Town (1999)
 Traditional Irish Music on Fiddle and Bouzouki, Volume II (2018)

With De Dannan
 De Danann (1975)
 The 3rd Irish Folk Festival In Concert (1976)
 Selected Jigs Reels and Songs (1977)
 The Mist Covered Mountain (1980)
 Star-Spangled Molly (1981) (see The De Dannan Collection)
 Best of De Dannan (1981)
 Song For Ireland (1983)
 The Irish RM (1984)
 Anthem (1985)
 Ballroom (1987)
 A Jacket of Batteries (1988)
 Half Set in Harlem (1991)
 Hibernian Rhapsody (1995)
 De Dannan Collection (1997) 
 How the West Was Won (1999)
 Welcome to the Hotel Connemara (2000)
 Wonderwaltz (2010)

Articles
 Interview (1991) + discography, by Paul Magnussen
 Kevin Macleod's obituary for Alec, containing lots of detail about his life.

References
 Long, Harry. (2005). The Waltons Guide to Irish Music: A Comprehensive A-Z Guide to Irish and Celtic Music in All Its Forms, Waltons Publishing, Dublin, Ireland, p. 136-7, .
 Phinn, Gervase. (2010) Road to the Dales. The Story of a Yorkshire Lad. Michael Joseph Ltd., 
 Wallis, Geoff & Sue Wilson. (2001). The Rough Guide to Irish Music, Rough Guides, London, England, p. 377-9, .

1944 births
2018 deaths
People from Rotherham
Bouzouki players
De Dannan members
English emigrants to Ireland